Erick Anthony Cabalceta Giacchero (born 9 January 1993) is a professional footballer who currently plays for Liga FPD club Liga Deportiva Alajuelense. Born in Costa Rica, he plays for the El Salvador national team.

Club career
Born in San José, Cabalceta played youth football with Municipal Tibás before playing as a defender for Brujas and Orión, both in the Costa Rican Primera División. Cabalceta has Italian heritage and acquired Italian citizenship in 2012 before signing a four-year contract with Serie A side Calcio Catania. After one season captaining the club's youth side, he joined the senior squad for the 2013–14 season. In September 2015, Deportivo Saprissa signed Erick Cabalceta and midfielder Christian Bolanos.

Cartaginés
In June 2014, Cabalceta was signed by Cartaginés on a 1-year contract on loan.

Saint Louis FC
On November 30, 2016, Saint Louis FC announced they have agreed to a contract with defender Erick Cabalceta pending United Soccer League and United States Soccer Federation approval.

International career
Cabalceta was born in Costa Rica, and is of Salvadoran descent through a grandmother. He has appeared for the Costa Rica national under-20 football team in the 2013 CONCACAF U-20 Championship where they were eliminated by Cuba in the knockout stage.

He opted to represent the El Salvador national team in 2022. He debuted with them in a 3–1 CONCACAF Nations League win over Grenada on 7 June 2022.

References

External links

Player biography at golsicilia.it 

1993 births
Living people
Footballers from San José, Costa Rica
Salvadoran footballers
El Salvador international footballers
Costa Rican footballers
Costa Rica youth international footballers
Brujas FC players
Catania S.S.D. players
C.S. Cartaginés players
Costa Rican expatriate footballers
Expatriate footballers in Italy
Salvadoran expatriate sportspeople in Italy
Costa Rican expatriate sportspeople in Italy
Saint Louis FC players
Salvadoran people of Costa Rican descent
Salvadoran people of Italian descent
Costa Rican people of Italian descent
Costa Rican people of Salvadoran descent
Association football defenders